Cavendish is a township in the Shire of Southern Grampians in the Western District of Victoria, Australia, on the Wannon River. At the 2006 census, Cavendish and the surrounding area had a population of 454.

The township was settled in the early 1850s, the Post Office opening on 1 April 1853. A railway line linking the town to Hamilton was opened on 2 November 1915 and closed on 1 July 1979.

The mobile library from Hamilton makes regular visits, and there is also a Men's Shed. The local pub, The Bunyip Hotel is situated on the banks of the Wannon River. The Bridge Cafe is also a small general store, with gas bottle exchange available, and clean and welcoming dine-in facilities. There is a walk (Settlers Walk) along the Wannon River, with views of waterbirds and other birds, as well as sheep, which, along with cattle, are a major local industry.

Four churches service the community.  There is also a caravan/camping area, a police station, and some accommodation.  The town has a kindergarten and a primary school. It has a football team playing in the South West District Football League.

References

External links

Towns in Victoria (Australia)